Omar T. Jacobs (born March 3, 1984) is a former American football quarterback. He played college football at Bowling Green and was drafted by the Pittsburgh Steelers in the fifth round of the 2006 NFL Draft. Jacobs was also a member of the Philadelphia Eagles, Kansas City Chiefs, Florence Phantoms, San Jose Wolves, Jacksonville Sharks, Wichita Falls Nighthawks and Rio Grande Valley Sol.

Early years
Jacobs graduated from Atlantic Community High School in  Delray Beach, Florida. His senior year (2002), he led his team to Florida's state semifinals, throwing for 300 yards and three touchdowns in a loss. He was also awarded Palm Beach County player of the year honors and 2nd team All-State honors.

College career
In 2004, his sophomore season, Jacobs set the record for the best touchdown-to-interception ratio in NCAA Division I-A history (10.25:1). In 2005, Jacobs was expected to contend for the Heisman Trophy, awarded to the year's best college football player, but an injury to his non-throwing shoulder considerably reduced his productivity.

Jacobs skipped his senior season at Bowling Green to enter the NFL draft. Jacobs left Bowling Green State University as the school's all-time leader in touchdown passes (71) and third in career passing yards (6,938).

2003: 19/28 for 345 yards with 4 touchdowns vs no interceptions.  18 carries for 89 yards and 2 touchdowns.
2004: 309/462 for 4,002 yards with 41 touchdowns vs 4 interceptions.  95 carries for 300 yards and 4 touchdowns.
2005: 195/321 for 2,591 yards with 25 touchdowns vs 7 interceptions.  40 carries for 62 yards and 1 touchdown.

Awards and honors
2004
 CNNSI.com honorable mention All-American
 MVP of the 2004 GMAC Bowl
 First-team All-MAC
 MAC Offensive Player of the Year
 Led the nation in touchdown passes with a MAC-record 41
 Led the nation in points responsible for per game (22.5)--his 45 touchdowns responsible for also was a MAC record
 Second nationally in total yards per game (358.5)--his 4,002 yards passing was the second highest total in the country
 Third nationally in passing efficiency (165.47)
 41 touchdowns to four interceptions thrown was the best ratio in NCAA I-A history

2005
 Davey O'Brien Award semifinalist
 Two-time MAC East Offensive Player of the Week
 Second-team preseason All-American choice by The Sporting News
 Preseason candidate for the Maxwell Award and the Walter Camp Award

Professional career

Pittsburgh Steelers
He was selected in the fifth round of the 2006 NFL Draft, with the 164th overall pick, by the Pittsburgh Steelers. At the end of the preseason, he was sent to the practice squad. Jacobs was released from the practice squad and cut from the team following training camp.

Philadelphia Eagles
On November 21, 2006, he was signed to the Philadelphia Eagles practice squad and cut on January 3, 2007.

Kansas City Chiefs
On February 12, 2007, he was signed to the Kansas City Chiefs and allocated to NFL Europe where he was to play for the Berlin Thunder. However, prior to the start of the season, Jacobs was injured and spent the entire preseason on injured reserve. He was cut by the Chiefs on September 2.

Florence Phantoms
Before the Florence Phantoms 2008 season, Jacobs was signed to the roster where he would be the starting quarterback. Jacobs  completed 208-362 passes for over 3,000 yards with 56 touchdowns and 12 interceptions to lead the Phantoms to their first ever AIFA Championship Bowl win. He also earned AIFA Championship Bowl II MVP , AIFA League MVP Award and All-AIFA honors. Jacobs had planned to move to the Arena Football League to play for the Tampa Bay Storm for the 2009 season, but when the AFL was canceled, he returned to Florence.

San Jose Wolves
On December 3, 2009, Jacobs was signed by the San Jose Wolves of the AIFA. Jacobs finished the 2009/2010 season with 5002 passing yards and 68 touchdowns, leading the Wolves to the  playoffs and conference championship game in their inaugural season. Jacobs was expected to return for the 2010/11 season but was signed by the Jacksonville Sharks of the AFL during training camp.

Jacksonville Sharks
In 2010, Jacobs signed with the Jacksonville Sharks of the Arena Football League. He didn't see any playing time in 2010, and in 2011, he spent the season as the backup to Aaron Garcia. He would return in 2012 to compete with Chris Leak for the starting quarterback spot.

Wichita Falls Nighthawks
Jacobs played for the Wichita Falls Nighthawks from 2013 to 2014.

AFL statistics

Stats from ArenaFan:

See also
 List of NCAA major college football yearly passing leaders

References

External links
 

1984 births
Living people
American football quarterbacks
Florence Phantoms players
Bowling Green Falcons football players
Jacksonville Sharks players
Kansas City Chiefs players
Philadelphia Eagles players
Pittsburgh Steelers players
San Jose Wolves players
Sportspeople from Delray Beach, Florida
Players of American football from Florida
Rio Grande Valley Sol players
Wichita Falls Nighthawks players